IGP is an online retailer of personalised, floral, gourmet and handmade gifting products. The company is headquartered in Mumbai, India and has offices in India, Singapore and the United States.

IGP is owned and operated by Join Ventures.

History 
IGP was founded in 1999 and acquired by Indian entrepreneur and investor Tarun Joshi in 2012. In 2015, the company acquired ArtisanGilt, an e-commerce portal for ethnic wear and fashion jewellery.

In 2017, the company launched an online gift discovery platform that provides context-based search allowing users to discover a particular gift, based on parameters such as recipient, relationship, occasion and personality. It is India's first gift discovery platform according to Business Standard.

Retail categories 
Some of the product categories at IGP include Festival Merchandise, Flowers, Cakes, Plants, Gourmet foods, Personalized Products, Gift Cards, Jewellery, Toys & Games and Home & Living.

Partnership
In October 2017, Interflora, a global flower delivery network opened its first office in Mumbai in partnership with IGP. In July 2019, IGP formed a partnership with The Womb as a part of their business and brand growth journey.

IGP was the official gifting partner of the Akshay Kumar starrer Rakshabandhan movie.

Funding
In October 2016, IGP raised $2 million (₹13 crore approx) in seed funding. The round was led by angel investors Naveen Arya, promoter, Karamchand Appliances and Tarun Joshi, Director, PE firm, 3i.

In December 2017, the company raised an undisclosed amount of Pre Series A funding led by Venture Catalysts.

In February 2022, the company secured $10 million in a Series A funding round led by DSG Consumer Partners, Rajiv Dadlani Group, 9Unicorns and Venture Catalysts.

Awards and recognition 
2011:
 IGP has been named among India's 20 hottest e-commerce start-ups by Rediff.

2013:
 IGP was awarded the Pepperfry India e-Retail Award.

See also 
 Archies (company)
 Etsy
 Ferns N Petals
 1-800-Flowers

References

External links 
 Official Website

Retail companies of India
Florist companies
Retail companies established in 1999
Companies based in Mumbai
Internet properties established in 1999
Floral industry
Online retailers of India
Indian companies established in 1999
1999 establishments in Maharashtra